Ruben Villa (born April 16, 1997) is an American professional boxer who challenged for the WBO featherweight title in October 2020. As an amateur he was a two-time U.S. National Golden Gloves champion. As of June 2020, he is ranked as the world's eighth best active featherweight by The Ring.

Amateur career
As an amateur, Villa compiled a record of 116–17, winning two U.S. National Golden Gloves Championships and competing at the U.S. Olympic Trials. He holds notable wins over WBO featherweight champion, Shakur Stevenson, and WBC lightweight champion, Devin Haney.

Professional career
Villa made his professional debut on July 29, 2016, scoring a first-round knockout (KO) victory over Gerardo Molina at the DoubleTree Hotel in Ontario, California.

After compiling a record of 10–0 (4 KOs) he defeated Marlon Olea on April 14, 2018, at the Salinas Storm House in Salinas, California, capturing the WBO Youth featherweight title by unanimous decision (UD) over eight rounds. All three judges scored the bout 80–72.

After four more wins in non-title fights, one by KO, he won his second professional title by defeating Luis Lopez-Vargas via UD on May 10, 2019, to capture the vacant WBO International featherweight title, with the judges' scorecards reading 98–92, 97–93 and 96–94. He retained the title against Enrique Vivas by UD in September followed by a UD victory against Alexei Collado in January 2020.

Professional boxing record

References

Living people
1997 births
American male boxers
Sportspeople from Salinas, California
Boxers from California
Featherweight boxers
Super-featherweight boxers